Patricia Bowen Evans Whitford (1926 – 19 January 2020) was a Welsh gymnast. She competed in the women's artistic team all-around at the 1948 Summer Olympics.

References

External links
 

1926 births
2020 deaths
British female artistic gymnasts
Olympic gymnasts of Great Britain
Gymnasts at the 1948 Summer Olympics
Sportspeople from Swansea